Monticello is a city in Jones County, Iowa, United States.  As of the 2020 census, the city population was 4,040.

Geography
Monticello is located at  (42.238759, -91.189067). Monticello is 824 feet above sea level.

For many years, U.S. Route 151 passed directly through Monticello. In 2004, a four-lane bypass around Monticello was completed and opened. As a result, the highway was moved approximately one mile east of the previous route.

Demographics

Monticello is part of the Cedar Rapids Metropolitan Statistical Area.

2010 census
As of the census of 2010, there were 3,796 people, 1,693 households, and 991 families living in the city. The racial makeup of the city was 98.6% White, 0.3% African American, 0.3% Asian, 0.3% from other races, and 0.5% from two or more races. Hispanic or Latino of any race were 1.3% of the population.

There were 1,693 households, of which 25.8% had children under the age of 18 living with them, 46.5% were married couples living together, 8.6% had a female householder with no husband present, 3.4% had a male householder with no wife present, and 41.5% were non-families. 35.6% of all households were made up of individuals, and 18.1% had someone living alone who was 65 years of age or older. The average household size was 2.18 and the average family size was 2.82.

The median age in the city was 43.3 years. 22.3% of residents were under the age of 18; 6.9% were between the ages of 18 and 24; 22.8% were from 25 to 44; 26.3% were from 45 to 64; and 21.8% were 65 years of age or older. The gender makeup of the city was 47.5% male and 52.5% female.

2000 census
As of the census of 2000, there were 3,607 people, 1,538 households, and 979 families living in the city. The racial makeup of the city was 98.75% White, 0.19% African American, 0.08% Native American, 0.14% Asian, 0.17% from other races, and 0.67% from two or more races. Hispanic or Latino of any race were 1.16% of the population.

There were 1,538 households, out of which 26.9% had children under the age of 18 living with them, 51.4% were married couples living together, 9.4% had a female householder with no husband present, and 36.3% were non-families. 31.5% of all households were made up of individuals, and 17.4% had someone living alone who was 65 years of age or older. The average household size was 2.26 and the average family size was 2.82.

Population spread: 23.1% under the age of 18, 7.3% from 18 to 24, 24.5% from 25 to 44, 21.3% from 45 to 64, and 23.8% who were 65 years of age or older. The median age was 42 years. For every 100 females, there were 85.0 males. For every 100 females age 18 and over, there were 82.2 males.

The median income for a household in the city was $34,932, and the median income for a family was $42,616. Males had a median income of $30,324 versus $20,998 for females. The per capita income for the city was $16,699. About 3.6% of families and 7.2% of the population were below the poverty line, including 5.8% of those under age 18 and 6.7% of those age 65 or over.

Education
The Monticello Community School District operates local public schools.

Notable people

 Samuel Charles Black (1869–1921), Fifth president of Washington & Jefferson College
 Colleen Conway-Welch (1944–2018), Dean of Nursing at Vanderbilt University School
 Roy Crabb (1890–1940), Major League Baseball pitcher
 Mike Dirks, All-American and All-Western Athletic Conference Football Player at University of Wyoming and Philadelphia Eagles
 Ellen Dolan, television actress, most notably in Guiding Light and As the World Turns
 Sewall S. Farwell (1834–1909), Civil War Veteran, Congressman
 Sheri Greenawald (b. 1947), soprano
 Charles W. Gurney (1840–1913), Lieutenant Colonel during the American Civil War and founder of Gurney's Seed and Nursery Company
 Alva L. Hager (1850–1923), Congressman
 Donald Knapp, Iowa State Representative
 Roger McMurrin, Conductor of Kiev Symphony
 Kraig Paulsen, Iowa State Representative
 Cornelia Marvin Pierce (1873–1957), Librarian
 Bob Reade, 1998 inductee into the College Football Hall of Fame
 Walter Rice (1866–1930), a Denver architect born and raised in Monticello
 Grace Sandhouse (1896–1940), Entomologist 
 Charles Henry Sloan (1863–1946), former Nebraska politician
 J. Remington Wilde (born 1951), professional songwriter
 Ray Zirkelbach, Iowa State Representative

References

Further reading
 History of Jones County, Iowa, past and present - Vol 1; R.M. Corbit; S. J. Clarke Publishing; 1910 (update of 1871 issue).
 History of Jones County, Iowa, past and present - Vol 2; R.M. Corbit; S. J. Clarke Publishing; 1871.

External links

 City of Monticello
 Monticello Area Chamber of Commerce

Cities in Iowa
Cities in Jones County, Iowa
Cedar Rapids, Iowa metropolitan area